Dane is a village in Dane County, Wisconsin, United States. The population was 1,117 at the 2020 census. Located in the Town of Dane, the village is part of the Madison Metropolitan Statistical Area.

History
A post office called Dane was first established in 1844. The village was named for Nathan Dane, author of the Northwest Ordinance. The village was incorporated in April 1899. The community's St. Michael Catholic Church was struck by lightning and burned down in 1974, but has since been rebuilt.

Geography

The major road is the community is Wisconsin Highway 113, which is the village's Main Street running in an east–west direction. The highway heads north to Lodi and south to Waunakee.

Demographics

2010 census
As of the census of 2010, there were 995 people, 363 households, and 266 families living in the village. The racial makeup of the village was 94.7% White, 0.8% African American, 0.1% Native American, 1.7% Asian, 2.1% from other races, and 0.6% from two or more races. Hispanic or Latino of any race were 4.3% of the population.

There were 363 households, of which 43.8% had children under the age of 18 living with them, 59.0% were married couples living together, 7.4% had a female householder with no husband present, 6.9% had a male householder with no wife present, and 26.7% were non-families. 17.6% of all households were made up of individuals, and 4.1% had someone living alone who was 65 years of age or older. The average household size was 2.74 and the average family size was 3.14.

The median age in the village was 32.5 years. 29% of residents were under the age of 18; 8% were between the ages of 18 and 24; 32.5% were from 25 to 44; 22.4% were from 45 to 64; and 7.6% were 65 years of age or older. The gender makeup of the village was 52.8% male and 47.2% female.

2000 census
As of the census of 2000, there were 799 people, 279 households, and 205 families living in the village. The population density was 705.6 people per square mile (273.0/km2). There were 288 housing units at an average density of 254.3 per square mile (98.4/km2). The racial makeup of the village was 94.87% White, 0.38% Black or African American, 0.13% Native American, 2.38% Asian, 0.50% from other races, and 1.75% from two or more races. 1.88% of the population were Hispanic or Latino of any race.

There were 279 households, out of which 43.4% had children under the age of 18 living with them, 60.6% were married couples living together, 9.0% had a female householder with no husband present, and 26.5% were non-families. 16.5% of all households were made up of individuals, and 6.8% had someone living alone who was 65 years of age or older. The average household size was 2.86 and the average family size was 3.31.

In the village, the population was spread out, with 31.5% under the age of 18, 10.4% from 18 to 24, 36.9% from 25 to 44, 14.8% from 45 to 64, and 6.4% who were 65 years of age or older. The median age was 31 years. For every 100 females, there were 102.3 males. For every 100 females age 18 and over, there were 101.8 males.

The median income for a household in the village was $51,667, and the median income for a family was $56,250. Males had a median income of $34,792 versus $26,125 for females. The per capita income for the village was $18,533. About 3.8% of families and 5.4% of the population were below the poverty line, including 10.2% of those under age 18 and 9.3% of those age 65 or over.

Infrastructure

Railroad
Wisconsin and Southern railroad runs through town en route to Reedsburg.

Notable people

 Alfred Kunz, Catholic priest at St. Michael's Catholic Church (1967-1998)

References

External links
 Village of Dane, Wisconsin

Villages in Wisconsin
Villages in Dane County, Wisconsin
Madison, Wisconsin, metropolitan statistical area